Joseph Patrick Grace (born February 3, 1949, in Pittsfield, Massachusetts) is an entrepreneur currently based in New York City.

As a founding member at Chemical Bank's Entertainment Industries Group, Joseph specialized in providing production financing to major studios and independent producers including Warner Bros, Fox, Universal and Francis Coppola.

In the early 1980s, Joseph was hired by producer Arnon Milchan to become the first President of Regency Films. Feature films produced during his tenure included Martin Scorsese's King Of Comedy, Sergio Leone's Once Upon a Time In America, Ridley Scott's Legend, Terry' Gilliam's Brazil and War of the Roses.

Joseph left Regency to start Ovation Communications, a television direct marketing company responsible for a series of ground breaking campaigns including Suzanne Somers ThighMaster.

After selling his interest in Ovation, Joseph has continued to disrupt industries through his involvement in a series of successful startups including Global Health Alternatives, PerriconeMD Cosmeceuticals, FreeLotto.com, WebMD, Medscape, Ebewe Pharma and more.

Joseph is currently a partner at Chief Outsiders, a national consulting firm that works with mid-size companies to accelerate growth.

He holds a BSEE and MBA from Cornell University

1949 births
Living people
People from Pittsfield, Massachusetts
Film producers from Massachusetts